Scorpion Child is an American rock band from Austin, Texas, active since 2006. They released two albums.

History
Scorpion Child was formed in 2006 as an acoustic duo, consisting of Aryn Jonathan Black and Asa Savage. The bands name came from a song by the English rock / dark wave band The Cult. The band is signed to the German-based independent label Nuclear Blast and worked with Grammy-nominated producer Chris “Frenchie” Smith on their first two albums. Their music has been compared to Led Zeppelin, Uriah Heep, Rainbow and Black Sabbath, and the band has cited Krautrock, death rock, doom metal, goth (music) bands like Pentagram, Lucifer's Friend, The Sisters Of Mercy and Bauhaus as influences.

Scorpion Child released their self-titled debut album in June 2013. The album featured a lineup of Black, Cowart, rhythm guitarist Tom Frank, bassist Shaun Avants and drummer Shawn Alvear; with contributions from previous guitarist Chris Hodge. In a review of the album, one reviewer described Scorpion Child as "a heavy-riffing behemoth that takes the current glut of guitar-slinging retro-copyists and punches them through the pavement." The album reached #31 on the Billboard Heatseekers chart. The song "Polygon of Eyes" was featured as the iTunes single of the week in June 2013.

Frank, Avants and Alvear all left the band in 2014. Jon “The Charn” Rice, previously of the death metal band Job for a Cowboy, joined on drums and Alec Padron joined on bass. Instead of recruiting a new rhythm guitarist, the band added keyboardist AJ Vincent in early 2015. This lineup released the album Acid Roulette in June 2016. The album was noted for being heavier and more progressive than its predecessor, thanks to the strengths of the new lineup, while one reviewer noted the album's "Lizzy-meets-Maiden riffage." Acid Roulette reached #19 on the Billboard Heatseekers chart.

Scorpion Child went on hiatus in mid-2017. Drummer Jon Rice left the band and joined 
Uncle Acid. He has since toured as a fill-in drummer for Behemoth, Skeletonwitch and others. Bassist Alec Padron and keyboardist AJ Vincent also departed during this period. In late 2018, Black and Cowart reformed the band with guitarist Asa Savage (who was a founding member along with Black) and former drummer Shawn Alvear, plus new bassist Garth D. Condit. This lineup partially completed a new album. In February 2020, the band announced on social media that they had broken up the previous year. In 2021 the band reunited as Aryn Jonathan Black, Asa Savage, Adrian Arostone, Garth Condit and Jonas Wikstrand from the Swedish band Enforcer (band). They just finished a multi show stint for Austin's SXSW and are currently working on Album III with a sonic focus more on their originally intended dark wave and post punk roots,while still maintaining their signature hard rock sound. The band will resume touring shortly.

Band members
Aryn Jonathan Black – vocals (2006–present)
Asa Savage – rhythm guitar (2006-2010; 2018-present)
Jonas Wikstrand - Drums (2021-present)
Adrian Arostone - Lead Guitar (2021-present)
Garth D. Condit - bass (2018-present)
Christopher Jay Cowart – lead guitar, backing vocals (2010–2019)
Shawn Paul Alvear – drums (2010-2014; 2018-2019)
Shaun Avants – bass, backing vocals (?–2014)
Chris Hodge – rhythm guitar, backing vocals (?–2010)
Jeremy Cruz – drums
Dave Finner – rhythm guitar
Erick Sanger – bass
Jon "The Charn" Rice – drums (2014–2017)
Alec Padron - bass, backing vocals (2014–2017)
Aaron John "AJ" Vincent - organs, keyboards (2015–2017)
Tom "The Mole" Frank – rhythm guitar, backing vocals (2010–2014)

Discography
Studio albums
Scorpion Child (2013)
Acid Roulette (2016)

Singles
Livin with a Witch 7" (2010)
Polygon of Eyes 7" (2013)

EPs
Thy Southern Sting (2009)

References

External links

Musical groups established in 2006
Nuclear Blast artists
Heavy metal musical groups from Texas
American stoner rock musical groups
Musical groups from Austin, Texas